Trandal is a small village in the Hjørundfjord area of the municipality of Ørsta, Møre og Romsdal, Norway. The village has a population of approximately 7 people. Trandal is located along the Hjørundfjord midway between the villages of Leknes and Hundeidvik. The village is located among the Sunnmørsalpene mountains. There is a ferry service from this village to Store Standal, Leknes and to Sæbø.

Trandal has a lot of cabins for rent during spring, summer and autumn and also a popular pub which houses two large festivals during the summer; Trandalblues and Trandal Country Festival.

References

Ørsta
Villages in Møre og Romsdal